A double figure-eight loop, (also known as a bunny ears, or a dog eared loop) is a type of knot that forms two parallel loops, and resembles the figure-eight loop.

It is frequently used in climbing and caving as an easily untie-able knot that is capable of being attached to two bolts and equalised.

A variation of this knot exists, known as the double figure-eight follow through that creates another loop below the bulk of the knot, a feature that is useful for clipping safety ropes into.

References

External links 

Multi-loop knots
Climbing knots